Mount Cornwall is a prominent  summit located between the Elbow River valley and Little Elbow River valley of Kananaskis Country in the Canadian Rockies of Alberta, Canada. The peak is visible from Highway 66, weather permitting.  Mount Cornwall's nearest higher peak is Tombstone Mountain,  to the southwest.


History

The first ascent of the peak was made in 1949 by Arnold Choquette.

The mountain's name became official in 1951 by the Geographical Names Board of Canada.

Geology

Mount Cornwall is composed of sedimentary rock laid down during the Precambrian to Jurassic periods. Formed in shallow seas, this sedimentary rock was pushed east and over the top of younger rock during the Laramide orogeny.

Climate

Based on the Köppen climate classification, Mount Cornwall is located in a subarctic climate with cold, snowy winters, and mild summers. Temperatures can drop below  with wind chill factors below . Precipitation runoff from the mountain drains into the Elbow River which is a tributary of the Bow River.

See also
 Alberta's Rockies
 Geography of Alberta

References

External links
 Mount Cornwall weather web site: Mountain Forecast

Cornwall
Cornwalll